Laurence Mark is an American film and television producer. His works include The Greatest Showman (2017), Julie & Julia (2009), Dreamgirls (2006), I, Robot (2004), As Good as It Gets (1997), and Jerry Maguire (1996).

Life and career
Mark's production of The Greatest Showman, the movie musical starring Hugh Jackman, Zac Efron, Michelle Williams and Zendaya and directed by Michael Gracey, grossed over $425 million worldwide. It has achieved the highest domestic gross of any live-action original movie musical of all time.

He also served as one of the executive producers of Vivo, an animated movie musical with original songs and the voice of another executive producer Lin-Manuel Miranda in the title role.  Directed by Kirk DeMicco, the movie was released earlier this year by Netflix in conjunction with Sony Pictures Animation, and it was one of Netflix’s strongest performers, the fifth longest running movie last year on the streamer’s Top Ten List.

Mark produced the film Lady Chatterley's Lover (2015), based on the novel by D. H. Lawrence. This Netflix/Sony adaptation stars Emma Corrin and Jack O’Connell and is directed by Laure de Clermont-Tonnerre with a script written by David Magee.

Mark previously produced Last Vegas (2013), starring Michael Douglas, Robert De Niro, Morgan Freeman and Kevin Kline, and directed by Jon Turteltaub; Flatliners (2017), starring Ellen Page, Diego Luna, Nina Dobrev and directed by Niels Arden Oplev; and Julie & Julia (2009), starring Meryl Streep and Amy Adams and written and directed by Nora Ephron.

For television, Mark was an executive producer of When We Rise, the limited series created and written by Dustin Lance Black and starring Guy Pearce, Mary-Louise Parker and Rachel Griffiths which aired early in 2021 on ABC.

With Bill Condon, Mark served as producer of the Hugh Jackman-hosted 81st Academy Awards, which earned him an Emmy nomination. The show itself received ten Emmy nominations and won four.

Before that, Mark produced Dreamgirls (2006), starring Jamie Foxx, Beyoncé Knowles and Eddie Murphy and directed by Bill Condon. The film won three Golden Globe Awards, including one for Best Picture. It also received eight Academy Award nominations, the most of any movie in its year, and won two of them, including one for Jennifer Hudson as Best Supporting Actress.

Mark received an Academy Award nomination for producing Best Picture nominee Jerry Maguire, and he executive-produced two other Academy Award nominees for Best Picture, As Good as It Gets and Working Girl.

Mark garnered an Emmy nomination and a Golden Globe nomination as executive producer of Political Animals, a limited series created by Greg Berlanti and starring Sigourney Weaver which aired in 2012 on the USA Network.

He is also an executive producer of The Art of More starring Dennis Quaid, Kate Bosworth, Cary Elwes and Christian Cooke which streamed for two seasons on Sony's Crackle.

Mark also produced Romy and Michele's High School Reunion , Last Holiday, and The Lookout, which won the Independent Spirit Award for Best First Feature. In addition to these films, Mark produced Finding Forrester, The Object of My Affection, Anywhere but Here, The Adventures of Huck Finn, Black Widow and Center Stage (plus its two sequels).

Laurence Mark Productions is headquartered at Sony Pictures Entertainment where the company has a long-term production arrangement with Columbia Pictures.  Mark's other producing credits include Sister Act 2, True Colors, Bicentennial Man, Simon Birch, Riding in Cars with Boys, Glitter, and How Do You Know.

Prior to producing, Mark held several publicity and marketing posts at Paramount Pictures, before being appointed Vice President of West Coast Marketing. He then moved into production, and as Vice President of Production at Paramount and Executive Vice President of Production at Twentieth Century Fox, he was closely involved with the development and production of such films as Terms of Endearment, Trading Places, Falling in Love, The Fly and Broadcast News. By 1986, he left Fox in order to start off Laurence Mark Productions, with a three-year, non-exclusive, first-look agreement at the Fox studio.

Mark was born in New York City and educated at Eaglebrook School, The Hotchkiss School, and Wesleyan University, from which he graduated in 1971. He holds a Masters of Arts degree in Film from New York University.

He currently resides in Los Angeles and New York.

Films 
He was a producer in all films unless otherwise noted.

Film

Miscellaneous crew

Thanks

Television

Awards and nominations

References

External links

1949 births
Living people
20th-century American businesspeople
21st-century American businesspeople
20th Century Studios people
American film producers
American television producers
Businesspeople from New York City
Film producers from New York (state)
Hotchkiss School alumni
Paramount Pictures executives
Television producers from New York City
Tisch School of the Arts alumni
Wesleyan University alumni